Interleukin 8 receptor, beta  is a chemokine receptor. IL8RB is also known as CXCR2, and CXCR2 is now the IUPHAR Committee on Receptor Nomenclature and Drug classification-recommended name.

Function 

The protein encoded by this gene is a member of the G-protein-coupled receptor family. This protein is a receptor for interleukin 8 (IL8). It binds to IL8 with high affinity, and transduces the signal through a G-protein-activated second messenger system (Gi/o-coupled). This receptor also binds to chemokine (C-X-C motif) ligand 1 (CXCL1/MGSA), a protein with melanoma growth stimulating activity, and has been shown to be a major component required for serum-dependent melanoma cell growth. In addition, it binds ligands CXCL2, CXCL3, and CXCL5.

The angiogenic effects of IL8 in intestinal microvascular endothelial cells are found to be mediated by this receptor. Knockout studies in mice suggested that this receptor controls the positioning of oligodendrocyte precursors in developing spinal cord by arresting their migration. IL8RB, IL8RA, which encodes another high affinity IL8 receptor, and IL8RBP, a pseudogene of IL8RB, form a gene cluster in a region mapped to chromosome 2q33-q36.

Mutations in CXCR2 cause hematological traits.

Senescence 

Knock-down studies involving the chemokine receptor CXCR2 alleviates both replicative and oncogene-induced senescence (OIS) and diminishes the DNA-damage response. Also, ectopic expression of CXCR2 results in premature senescence via a p53-dependent mechanism.

See also 
 Interleukin 8 receptor, alpha
 Interleukin 8
 Interleukin
 Interleukin receptor
 Cluster of differentiation
 G protein-coupled receptor

References

Further reading

External links 
 
 

Chemokine receptors
Clusters of differentiation
Senescence